Thomas Coulson (1645–1713), of Tower Royal, London, was an English politician.

He was a Member (MP) of the Parliament of England and Parliament of Great Britain for Totnes on 14 December 1692 – 1695, 1698–1708 and 1710 – 2 June 1713.

References

1645 births
1713 deaths
Politicians from London
Members of the Parliament of Great Britain for Totnes
British MPs 1707–1708
British MPs 1708–1710
British MPs 1710–1713
English MPs 1690–1695
English MPs 1698–1700
English MPs 1701
English MPs 1701–1702
English MPs 1702–1705
English MPs 1705–1707
Members of the Parliament of England (pre-1707) for Totnes